The Deccan Chargers (DC) were a franchise cricket team based in Hyderabad, India, that competed in the Indian Premier League (IPL), a professional Twenty20 cricket (T20) league in India. They were one of the nine teams that competed in the 2012 Indian Premier League, making their fifth appearance in all IPL tournaments. The team was captained by Kumar Sangakkara and coached by Darren Lehmann.

The Deccan Chargers started their campaign by losing their opening fixture of the IPL on 7 April against the Chennai Super Kings and failed to qualify for playoffs finishing eighth in the group stage. On 14 September 2012, the IPL governing council terminated the Deccan Chargers for breaching contract terms and put the Hyderabad franchise on auction. The bid was won by the Sun TV Network and the team was renamed as the Sunrisers Hyderabad.

Player Acquisition

Players retained: Akash Bhandari, Bharat Chipli, Daniel Christian, Shikhar Dhawan, Kedar Devdhar, JP Duminy, Ravi Teja Dwaraka, Manpreet Gony, Ishank Jaggi, Chris Lynn, Amit Mishra, Anand Rajan, Ashish Reddy, Kumar Sangakkara, Ankit Sharma, Ishant Sharma, Sunny Sohal, Dale Steyn, Rusty Theron, Cameron White, Arjun Yadav

Players released: Michael Lumb, Ishan Malhotra, Jaydev Shah

Players traded away: Harmeet Singh Bansal, Pragyan Ojha, Kevin Pietersen

Players acquired by trade: Abhishek Jhunjhunwala

Players added in the auction: Darren Bravo, Daniel Harris, Parthiv Patel

Uncapped players acquired: Sneha Kishore Chikkam, Tanmay Mishra, Syed Quadri, Akshath Reddy, Biplab Samantray, Veer Pratap Singh, Tanmay Srivastava, Sudhindra Taduri, Atchuta Rao Tekkami

Players who withdrew from the competition: Darren Bravo, Ishant Sharma

Squad
 Players with international caps are listed in bold.
 Year signed Year is the season the player first signed for the team

Kit manufacturers and sponsors

Season Overview

Standings

Results by match

Fixtures

All times are in Indian Standard Time (UTC+05:30)

Group stage

Statistics

Source: 2012 IPL Statistics Full Table on Cricinfo

Awards and achievements

Awards
Man of the Match

Achievements
 Best batting average in the 2012 IPL : JP Duminy (81.33)
 Most maiden overs bowled in the 2012 IPL : Dale Steyn (2)
 Fastest ball bowled in the 2012 IPL : Dale Steyn (154.40 km/h)

Termination
Due to financial problems Deccan Chronicle Holdings Ltd, the team owner of Deccan Chargers announced a sale of their team by auction. The sale, announced in a newspaper advertisement on Thursday, was to be through a bidding process that was to be completed on 13 September, with the winning bid to be announced on the same day. However the auction for the franchise on 13 September 2012 ended with no results as the team's owners rejecting the sole bid they received from PVP Ventures. It was reported that Deccan Chargers owner rejected the bid by PVP ventures as DCHL's bankers were not happy with PVP's plan to divide the bid amount in two parts over the next ten years. Later on 14 September 2012, the IPL governing council terminated the Chargers for breaching contract terms. The Sun TV Network won the bid for the Hyderabad franchise, the BCCI confirmed on 25 October 2012. The new team was named the Sunrisers Hyderabad.

Notes

Footnotes

References

External links

2012 Indian Premier League
Indian Premier League
Cricket in Hyderabad, India